Erosina is a genus of moths in the family Geometridae erected by Achille Guenée in 1858.

Species
Erosina cervinaria Blanchard, 1882
Erosina excludaria Möschler, 1890
Erosina hyberniata Guenée, [1858]
Erosina hyberniata fulvescens Prout, 1931
Erosina proximata Dognin, 1891
Erosina rusticata Maassen, 1890

References

Geometridae